Belfast was a constituency in the Irish House of Commons, the house of representatives of the Kingdom of Ireland, until 1800.

History
Belfast in County Antrim was enfranchised as a borough constituency in 1613. It continued to be entitled to send two Members of Parliament to the Irish House of Commons until the Parliament of Ireland was merged into the Parliament of the United Kingdom on 1 January 1801.

During the Commonwealth of England, Scotland and Ireland Belfast was represented from 1654 in the Westminster Parliament as part of the Carrickfergus and Belfast constituency. Belfast was the place of election in this single-member constituency. See First Protectorate Parliament for further details.

In 1661, following the restoration of the King, the Parliament of Ireland was re-established as it had existed before the Protectorate. In the Patriot Parliament of 1690 summoned by King James II, Belfast was represented by one member.

Under the Acts of Union 1800 the Parliament of Ireland was merged with the Parliament of Great Britain to form the Parliament of the United Kingdom. The 300 members of the Irish House of Commons were reduced to 100 Irish members of the United Kingdom House of Commons. As part of that process Belfast lost one of its seats.

Members of Parliament, 1613–1801

Notes

References

Bibliography

Constituencies of the Parliament of Ireland (pre-1801)
Historic constituencies in Belfast
1613 establishments in Ireland
1800 disestablishments in Ireland
Constituencies established in 1613
Constituencies disestablished in 1800